, also known as Kyōun, was a  following Taihō and preceding Wadō. The period spanned the years from May 704 through January 708.

Change of era
 704 : The new era name was created to mark an event or series of events.  The previous era ended and the new one commenced in Taihō 4, on the 7th day of the 5th month of 704.

Events of the Keiun era
 697 (Keiun 4): Emperor Monmu dies, but his son and heir was deemed too young to receive the succession (senso). Instead, the mother of the heir formally accedes to the throne (sokui) as Empress Gemmei until her son would grow mature enough to accept senso and sokui.
 18 July 707 (Keiun 4, 15th day of the 6th month): Genmei is enthroned at the age of 48.
 707 (Keiun 4): Deposits of copper was reported to have been found in Musashi Province in the region which includes modern day Tokyo.
 708 (Keiun 5):, The era name was about to be changed to mark the accession of Empress Genmei; but the choice of Wadō as the new nengō for this new reign became a way to mark the welcome discovery of copper in the Chichibu District of what is now Saitama Prefecture.  The Japanese word for copper is dō (銅); and since this was indigenous copper, the "wa" (the ancient Chinese term for Japan) could be combined with the "dō" (copper) to create a new composite term—"wadō"—meaning "Japanese copper."

Notes

References
 Brown, Delmer M. and Ichirō Ishida, eds. (1979).  Gukanshō: The Future and the Past. Berkeley: University of California Press. ;  OCLC 251325323
 Nussbaum, Louis-Frédéric and Käthe Roth. (2005).  Japan encyclopedia. Cambridge: Harvard University Press. ;  OCLC 58053128
 Titsingh, Isaac. (1834). Nihon Ōdai Ichiran; ou,  Annales des empereurs du Japon.  Paris: Royal Asiatic Society, Oriental Translation Fund of Great Britain and Ireland. OCLC 5850691
 Varley, H. Paul. (1980). A Chronicle of Gods and Sovereigns: Jinnō Shōtōki of Kitabatake Chikafusa. New York: Columbia University Press.  ;  OCLC 6042764

External links
 National Diet Library, "The Japanese Calendar" -- historical overview plus illustrative images from library's collection

Japanese eras
8th century in Japan
704 beginnings
708 endings